The 1904 VPI football team represented Virginia Agricultural and Mechanical College and Polytechnic Institute in the 1904 college football season. The team was led by their head coach John C. O'Connor and finished with a record of five wins and three losses (5–3).

Schedule

Players
The following players were members of the 1904 football team according to the roster published in the 1905 edition of The Bugle, the Virginia Tech yearbook.

References

VPI
Virginia Tech Hokies football seasons
VPI football